The Bear Who Slept Through Christmas is an animated Christmas TV special. It premiered on NBC on December 17, 1973, in the United States. It was produced by DePatie-Freleng Enterprises, executive producer Norman Sedawie, and starred the voices of Tommy Smothers, Arte Johnson and Barbara Feldon, with narration by Casey Kasem.

The story focuses on Theodore Edward Bear (Ted E. Bear for short) who is curious about Christmas and decides to go searching for it while the other bears hibernate for the winter.

In the early 1980s, a plush Ted E. Bear was sold in stores. A Halloween sequel, The Great Bear Scare, was released in October 1983. It later aired on the Disney Channel until the late 1990s.

Rights to the special are now owned by Lionsgate. It is currently available through the Lionsgate channel on YouTube and on Tubi. It was formerly available on Netflix.

Cast 
 Robert Holt as Santa Claus and Mayor C. Emory Bear
 Kelly Lange as Weather Bear
 Michael Bell as Honey Bear
 Casey Kasem as the narrator
 Caryn Paperny as Girl
 Arte Johnson as Professor Werner von Bear
 Tom Smothers as Ted E. Bear
 Barbara Feldon as Patti Bear

See also
 List of Christmas films
 Santa Claus in film

References

External links
 

1970s animated television specials
1970s American television specials
NBC television specials
1973 television specials
Television specials by DePatie–Freleng Enterprises
American Christmas television specials
Animated Christmas television specials